Mateo Tanaquin (born 11 September 1927) was a Filipino wrestler. He competed in the men's freestyle lightweight at the 1956 Summer Olympics.

References

External links
 

1927 births
Possibly living people
Filipino male sport wrestlers
Olympic wrestlers of the Philippines
Wrestlers at the 1956 Summer Olympics
Place of birth missing
Wrestlers at the 1954 Asian Games
Wrestlers at the 1958 Asian Games
Asian Games competitors for the Philippines